The Suldalslågen (or locally, Lågen) is a river that is located in the municipality of Suldal in Rogaland county, Norway. The Norwegian National Road 13 runs along the river, past the villages of Suldal and Sand.

The Suldalslågen and its upstream watercourses are heavily dammed and regulated (including transfer of water across catchment borders) for hydroelectric power generation, and represents about 6% of Norway's total hydroelectric power generation. The upper tributaries of the Suldalslågen are located on the vast Hardangervidda plateau in Odda (in Hordaland county) and Vinje (in Telemark county).

The Suldalslågen one of Norway's most famous Atlantic salmon rivers, with a fishing history dating back hundreds of years.

See also
List of rivers in Norway

References

Rivers of Rogaland
Suldal
Rivers of Norway